Daisy McCrackin (born November 12, 1979) is an American actress and singer-songwriter.

Biography
McCrackin was born in Marin County, California, and raised in San Francisco.

She made her film debut in the 2001 straight-to-video movie A Crack in the Floor co-starring Mario Lopez. Since then she has appeared in television series such as Cold Case, Angel and The Division and movies such as Hollywood Horror, 3000 Miles to Graceland, Halloween: Resurrection (2002) and starred in the controversial film Love and Suicide (2005). She wrote the soundtrack and starred in the 2009 short film Till Death Do Us Part. Mica Film released this debut recording, Till Death Do Us Part, engineered by Steve Muhic in August 2009. Aeronaut Records followed with her EP release of The Rodeo Grounds in November 2009. She appeared in the 2011 film adaptation of Atlas Shrugged.

In the early-2010s, McCrackin resided in an artists colony in Topanga Canyon.

She released a full-length record in 2011 titled God Willing and had produced six music videos that are available on YouTube.

In 2018, Daisy starred in House of Demons and Delirium.

Kidnapping
On May 3, 2017 McCrackin and fellow actor Joseph Capone were victims of a kidnapping in Los Angeles. Three assailants, Amber Neal, Keith Andre Stewart and Johntae Jones, entered McCrackin’s home, "pistol whipped" Capone, and then covered his and McCrackin's heads with black hoods. From there, the kidnappers drove Capone to a house in Compton, stripped him nude, bound him, and placed him in a bathtub without food for around 30 hours.

Meanwhile, two of the other assailants drove McCrackin to several banks in her own car, and told her to provide at least $10,000 (£7,500) for the release of Capone. McCrackin was able to escape and alert police after being driven back to her home. The defendants were expected to appear in court on July 23, 2018 for a pre-trial hearing. All three face life in prison if convicted.

Filmography

Discography
The Rodeo Grounds (2009)
God Willing (2011)

See also
List of kidnappings

References

External links 
 
 Daisy McCrackin Releases Debut "The Rodeo Grounds"

1981 births
21st-century American singers
21st-century American women singers
21st-century American actresses
Actors from San Rafael, California
Actresses from San Francisco
American film actresses
American women singer-songwriters
Formerly missing people
Living people
Kidnapped American people
Musicians from San Francisco
Musicians from San Rafael, California
Singer-songwriters from California